The 2018–19 Saint Francis Red Flash men's basketball team represented Saint Francis University during the 2018–19 NCAA Division I men's basketball season. The Red Flash, were led by seventh-year head coach Rob Krimmel, played their home games at DeGol Arena in Loretto, Pennsylvania as members of the Northeast Conference.

The Red Flash finished the 2018–19 season at 18–15, 12–6 in NEC play to finish in a tie for first place. Due to tie breakers, they were the 1-seed in the 2019 Northeast Conference Men's Basketball Tournament. The Red Flash defeated Bryant in the quarterfinals and LIU Brooklyn in the semifinals, yet lost in the championship game to Fairleigh Dickinson. As Regular Season co-champions they received an NIT bid. Saint Francis lost to 1-seed Indiana in the first round.

Previous season
The Red Flash finished the 2016–17 season at 18–13, 12–6 in NEC play to finish in a tie for second place. They lost in the quarterfinals of the NEC tournament to Fairleigh Dickinson. They were invited to the CollegeInsider.com Tournament where they lost in the first round to UIC.

Roster

Schedule and results

|-
!colspan=9 style=| Non-conference regular season

|-
!colspan=9 style=| NEC regular season

|-
!colspan=9 style=| NEC tournament

|-
!colspan=9 style="|NIT

References

Saint Francis Red Flash men's basketball seasons
Saint Francis (PA)
Saint Francis
Saint Francis
Saint Francis